Peñarol is a Uruguayan professional rugby union team based in Montevideo. The team was founded in 2019 to compete in Súper Liga Americana de Rugby and is the rugby section of the Peñarol sports club. With its participation, Peñarol became the first professional rugby club in Uruguay.

Peñarol debuted officially on March, 2020, v Chilean team Selknam, which also takes part of Súper Liga Americana. The Carbonero was defeated 15–13.

Stadium
Their home stadium is Estadio Charrúa in Montevideo and holds up to 14,000 people.

Honours

 Súper Liga Americana de Rugby (1): 2022

Current squad 
The Peñarol Rugby squad for the 2023 Super Rugby Americas season is:

 Senior 15s internationally capped players are listed in bold.

References

External links
 

Uruguayan rugby union teams
Rugby clubs established in 2019
Peñarol
2019 establishments in Uruguay
Super Rugby Americas